is a railway station in the city of Ichinoseki, Iwate, Japan, operated by East Japan Railway Company (JR East).

Lines
Hanaizumi Station is served by the Tōhoku Main Line, and is located 431.2 km from the official starting point of the line at Tokyo Station.

Station layout
The station has a side platform and an island platform, both connected to the station building by a footbridge. The station has a "Midori no Madoguchi" staffed ticket office.

Platforms

History
Hanaizumi Station opened on 16 April 1890. It was absorbed into the JR East network upon the privatization of the Japanese National Railways (JNR) on 1 April 1987.

Passenger statistics
In fiscal 2018, the station was used by an average of 357 passengers daily (boarding passengers only).

Surrounding area
Ichinoseki City Hall Hanaizumi Branch (formerly Hanaizumi Town Hall)
Hanaizumi Post Office
Iwate Prefectural Hanaizumi High School
Iwate Prefectural Hanaizumi Hospital

See also
 List of Railway Stations in Japan

References

External links

  

Railway stations in Iwate Prefecture
Tōhoku Main Line
Railway stations in Japan opened in 1890
Ichinoseki, Iwate
Stations of East Japan Railway Company